Béré is a town in Zoundweogo Province, Burkina Faso.

References

Populated places in the Centre-Sud Region
Zoundwéogo Province